Eremophila glabra subsp. carnosa is a plant in the family Scrophulariaceae and is endemic to Western Australia.  It is similar to other shrubs in the species Eremophila glabra but is distinguished from them mainly by its narrow elliptic to lance-shaped leaves and by the type and arrangement of hairs on its leaves and branches. It is found in coastal areas between Leeman and Gregory.

Description

The lowest petal lobe is narrower that the rest and is turned back below the flower.

Taxonomy and naming
Eremophila glabra subsp. carnosa was first described in 2007 by Robert Chinnock in 2007.

Distribution and habitat
Eremophila glabra subsp. carnosa occurs in coastal areas between Gregory and Leeman where it grows in sand near saline flats.

References

Flora of Western Australia
glabra subsp. carnosa
Plants described in 2007
Plant subspecies